Harrison Eugene Havens (December 15, 1837 – August 16, 1916) was an American lawyer and politician. Havens was born in Franklin County, Ohio, and was the Republican Party Representative from Missouri from its 4th congressional district in the 42nd United States Congress between 1871 and 1873, and from its 6th congressional district in the 43rd United States Congress from 1873 to 1875.

Biography
Havens was born in Franklin County, Ohio, on December 15, 1837. He attended the local schools, studied law, was admitted to the bar, and practiced in Ohio before moving to Iowa to practice law and edit the Sigourney News newspaper.

During the American Civil War Havens served as commander of Company H, 47th Iowa Volunteer Infantry with the rank of captain.

After the war Havens moved to Illinois, and then to Springfield, Missouri, where he edited the Springfield Patriot newspaper in addition to practicing law.

In 1870 Havens was elected as a Republican to the Forty-second Congress. He was reelected to the Forty-third Congresses, and served from March 4, 1871 to March 3, 1875. In his second term Havens was chairman of the Committee on Public Expenditures. He was an unsuccessful candidate for reelection in 1874, and for the Missouri Senate in 1878.

In 1881 Havens became superintendent of the Springfield & Western Missouri Railway Company.  From 1893 to 1894 he served as prosecuting attorney of Greene County, Missouri.

Havens subsequently moved to Oklahoma, living first in Guthrie, and then in Enid. He was editor of the Enid Eagle newspaper, and served as a member of the Oklahoma Territory's Legislative Council in the late 1890s, where he was a prominent supporter of the unsuccessful effort to achieve immediate statehood.

In the early 1900s Havens moved to Cuba where he owned a plantation. He became ill in 1916 and was taken to Havana, where he died on August 16. Havens was buried at Colon Cemetery in Havana.

References

1837 births
1916 deaths
Republican Party members of the United States House of Representatives from Missouri
American emigrants to Cuba
19th-century American politicians
Writers from Enid, Oklahoma
Politicians from Enid, Oklahoma
19th-century American lawyers